Sanjak of Bosnia (/ Босански санџак) was one of the sanjaks of the Ottoman Empire established in 1463 when the lands conquered from the Bosnian Kingdom were transformed into a sanjak and Isa-Beg Isaković was appointed its first sanjakbey. In the period between 1463 and 1580 it was part of the Rumelia Eyalet. After the Bosnia Eyalet was established in 1580 the Bosnian Sanjak became its central province. Between 1864 and the Austro-Hungarian occupation of Bosnia in 1878 it was part of the Bosnia Vilayet that succeeded the Eyalet of Bosnia following administrative reforms in 1864 known as the "Vilayet Law". Although Bosnia Vilayet was officially still part of the Ottoman Empire until 1908 the Bosnian Sanjak ceased to exist in 1878.

Banja Luka became the seat of the Sanjak of Bosnia some time prior to 1554, until 1580 when the Bosnia Eyalet was established. Bosnian beylerbeys were seated in Banja Luka until 1639.

Demographics
Apostolic visitor Peter Masarechi claimed in his 1624 report that the population of Bosnia was 450,000 Muslims, 150,000 Catholics, and 75,000 Orthodox.

Administration 

List of sanjakbeys of Bosnian Sanjak is the following:

See also

 List of Ottoman governors of Bosnia
 Ottoman Bosnia and Herzegovina
 Pashaluk of Herzegovina
 Sanjak of Novi Pazar

References

Sources 
 

Sanjaks of the Ottoman Empire in Europe
Sanjak of Bosnia
1463 establishments in the Ottoman Empire
1878 disestablishments in the Ottoman Empire
States and territories established in 1463
States and territories disestablished in 1878
1463 establishments in Europe
1878 disestablishments in Europe
Former subdivisions of Bosnia and Herzegovina during Ottoman period